Modibo Diakité (born 2 March 1987) is a French professional footballer who plays as a centre-back for Italian Serie D club Roma City.

Club career

Pescara
Born in Bourg-la-Reine, Diakité moved to Italy at early age, and joined Sampdoria's youth setup. In 2004, he moved to Pescara, being initially assigned to the Primavera team.

Diakité made his first-team debut on 28 May 2006, in a 0–0 away draw against Mantova for the Serie B championship. Despite only playing one match for the first team, the 19-year-old Pescara youth product was recognized by giants Lazio, who signed him at the end of the 2005–06 season in co-ownership deal for €250,000.

Lazio
Although spending the vast majority of his first campaign appearing with the youth squad, Diakité made his first-team – and Serie A – debut on 1 April 2007, replacing Guglielmo Stendardo in the dying minutes of a 4–2 away win against Udinese. His first start came late in the month, in a 0–1 home loss against Fiorentina, also having a goal disallowed.

In June 2007 Lazio signed Diakité outright for another €250,000, and he was handed a starting spot for the first match of the campaign, against Torino. However, he eventually broke his tibia in the 2–2 home draw, missing the remainder of the season.

On 27 November 2008, Diakité extended his link with the Biancazzurri until 2013. He played his first match after returning from injury on 3 December, starting in a 2–1 away win against Milan for the campaign's Coppa Italia.

Diakité scored his first professional goal on 14 December 2008, netting his side's second through a header in a 3–3 away draw against Udinese. He subsequently became a regular starter, appearing in 25 matches and scoring once during the 2011–12 season.

Sunderland
On 10 June 2013, Premier League side Sunderland announced the arrival of Diakité on a free transfer. A starter under Paolo Di Canio, he was deemed surplus to requirements by new manager Gus Poyet, and was subsequently loaned to Fiorentina in January.

Diakité was released from Sunderland by mutual consent on 1 September 2014.

Fiorentina (loan)
On 31 January 2014, Diakité joined Fiorentina on loan for the rest of the season. He appeared in nine matches (all starts) for the Viola before returning to Sunderland in June.

Deportivo La Coruña
On 3 September 2014, Diakité signed for La Liga side Deportivo de La Coruña. He made his debut in the competition on 20 September, starting in a 2–8 home loss against Real Madrid.

Frosinone
On 10 July 2015 Diakité signed with Frosinone. He scored his first goal with the club on 8 November 2015 in the 38th minute of a 2–2 home draw against Genoa.

Sampdoria
On 1 February 2016 Diakité signed with Sampdoria.

Later years
In January 2017 Diakité signed with Ternana.

In October 2017, free agent Diakité joined Bari. After being released due to Bari's exclusion from Italian football, Diakité returned to Ternana, playing for them until June 2022.

In October 2022, Diakité agreed to return to Rome, signing for Serie D amateurs Roma City.

Style of play
A tactically versatile right-footed defender, Diakité is usually deployed as a centreback in a 3 or 4-man defence, although he is also capable of playing as a rightback. A quick, large, hard-working, and physically strong player, although not particularly skilled technically, he is known in particular for his ball-winning abilities and his strength in the air.

Personal life
Born in Bourg-La-Reine, France, Diakité also owns a Malian passport, as both of his parents are originally from Mali.

Honours
Lazio
Coppa Italia: 2008–09, 2012–13, Runners-up 2013–14
Supercoppa Italiana: 2009

References

External links
 
 
 

1987 births
Living people
People from Bourg-la-Reine
Association football defenders
French footballers
French people of Malian descent
Serie A players
Serie B players
Serie C players
Premier League players
La Liga players
Delfino Pescara 1936 players
S.S. Lazio players
Sunderland A.F.C. players
ACF Fiorentina players
Deportivo de La Coruña players
Cagliari Calcio players
Frosinone Calcio players
U.C. Sampdoria players
Ternana Calcio players
S.S.C. Bari players
French expatriate footballers
French expatriate sportspeople in Italy
Expatriate footballers in Italy
French expatriate sportspeople in England
Expatriate footballers in England
French expatriate sportspeople in Spain
Expatriate footballers in Spain
Footballers from Hauts-de-Seine